The 44th United States Colored Infantry was an infantry regiment that served in the Union Army during the American Civil War. The regiment was composed of African American enlisted men commanded by white officers and was authorized by the Bureau of Colored Troops which was created by the United States War Department on May 22, 1863.

Service
The 44th U.S. Colored Infantry was organized in Chattanooga, Tennessee beginning April 7, 1864 for three-year service under the command of Colonel Lewis Johnson.

The regiment was attached to District of Chattanooga, Department of the Cumberland, to November 1864. Unattached, District of the Etowah, Department of the Cumberland, to December 1864. 1st Colored Brigade, District of the Etowah, Department of the Cumberland, to January 1865. Unattached, District of the Etowah, to March 1865. 1st Colored Brigade, Department of the Cumberland, to July 1865. 2nd Brigade, 4th Division, District of East Tennessee, July 1865. Department of the Cumberland and Department of Georgia to April 1866.

The 44th U.S. Colored Infantry mustered out of service April 30, 1866.

Detailed service
Post and garrison duty at Chattanooga, Tennessee, until November, 1864. Action at Dalton, Georgia, October 13, 1864. Battle of Nashville, December 15–16. Pursuit of Hood to the Tennessee River December 17–28. Post and garrison duty at Chattanooga in the District of East Tennessee, and in the Department of Georgia until April 1866.

The regiment was captured at Dalton, Georgia in the largest surrender of African American soldiers during the war. Although the white officers were soon paroled, approximately 250 enlisted men were returned to their former owners. Another 350 enlisted men were pressed into Confederate service as personal servants for officers or as engineer labor in Mississippi and at Mobile, Alabama. By December 1, 1865, only 125 of these men were still alive. Col. Johnson returned to Tennessee as soon as he was able and recruited again for the regiment, mustering approximately 300 men.

Commanders
 Colonel Lewis Johnson

See also

 List of United States Colored Troops Civil War Units
 United States Colored Troops

References
 Dyer, Frederick H. A Compendium of the War of the Rebellion (Des Moines, IA: Dyer Pub. Co.), 1908.
 Evans, E. Raymond & David Scott. The 44th U.S. Colored Infantry Regiment and the Dalton Fort (Chattanooga, TN: The Authors), 2012.
Attribution

External links
 Times Free Press article by Robert Scott Davis about the 44th U.S. Colored Infantry

United States Colored Troops Civil War units and formations
Military units and formations established in 1864
Military units and formations disestablished in 1866